John Banville (born 8 December 1945) is an Irish novelist, short story writer, adapter of dramas and screenwriter. He has won the Booker Prize, the James Tait Black Memorial Prize, the Franz Kafka Prize, the Austrian State Prize for European Literature and the Prince of Asturias Award for Literature; has been elected a Fellow of the Royal Society of Literature; knighted by Italy; is one of the most acclaimed writers in the English language.

As well as his novels, short stories, plays and non-fiction, Banville has published book reviews and other articles, and written introductions for the neglected short stories of women such as Elizabeth Bowen and Edna O'Brien. A partial bibliography may be found here.  The composer of this page found it particularly helpful for locating the original publisher of Banville's books and it also verifies the year of publication of each. However, discrepancies remain between that bibliography and this one on the drama adaptations and original screenplays — for example, that bibliography calls the 1994 screenplay "Seachange", while the IMDb calls a screenplay from the same year by the title "Seascape". The reader of this bibliography ought to also bear in mind that, at the time of writing, the above bibliography does not include Banville's book reviews, nor does it include his articles for various newspapers and magazine publications. A sample of these may be found below.

Articles

Book reviews

Other

Books

Novels
 Nightspawn. London: Secker & Warburg, 1971
 Birchwood. London: Secker & Warburg, 1973
 The Revolutions Trilogy :
 Doctor Copernicus. London: Secker & Warburg, 1976
 Kepler. London: Secker & Warburg, 1981
 The Newton Letter. London: Secker & Warburg, 1982
 Mefisto. London: Secker & Warburg, 1986
 The Frames Trilogy
 The Book of Evidence. London: Secker & Warburg, 1989
 Ghosts. London: Secker & Warburg, 1993
 Athena. London: Secker & Warburg, 1995
 The Untouchable. London: Picador, 1997
 The Alexander and Cass Cleave Trilogy
 Eclipse. London: Picador, 2000
 Shroud. London: Picador, 2002
 Ancient Light. London: Viking Penguin, 2012
 The Sea. London: Picador, 2005
 The Infinities. London: Picador, 2009
 The Blue Guitar. London: Viking Penguin, 2015
 Mrs Osmond. London: Penguin, 2017
 Snow. London: Faber & Faber, 2020 
 April in Spain. London: Faber & Faber, 2021
 The Singularities (2022)

Short stories
 Long Lankin. London: Secker & Warburg, 1970; revised edition 1984

For children
 The Ark. Oldcastle: Gallery, 1996

Non-fiction
 Prague Pictures: Portrait of a City. London: Bloomsbury, 2003
 Time Pieces: A Dublin Memoir. Dublin: Hachette Books, 2016

Pseudonymous works
The following have been published as Benjamin Black:
Quirke series
 Christine Falls. London: Picador, 2006
 The Silver Swan. London: Picador, 2007
 Elegy for April. London: Picador, 2011
 A Death in Summer. London: Mantle, 2011
 Vengeance. London: Mantle, 2012
 Holy Orders. New York: Henry Holt, 2013
 Even the Dead. London: Penguin, 2016
 April in Spain. London: Faber & Faber, 2021 [published as John Banville]
 The Lemur. London: Picador, 2008 (previously serialised in The New York Times)
 The Black-Eyed Blonde. New York: Henry Holt, 2014 (a Philip Marlowe novel)
 Prague Nights. London: Penguin, 2017 (known to U.S. readers as Wolf on a String)
 The Secret Guests, 2020

Plays
 The Broken Jug. Oldcastle: Gallery, 1995 (after Heinrich von Kleist's play of that name)
 Seachange. Unpublished (performed 1994 in the Focus Theatre, Dublin)
 Dublin 1742. Unpublished (performed 2002 in The Ark, Dublin; a play for those between the ages of nine and fourteen)
 God's Gift: A Version of Amphitryon by Heinrich von Kleist. Oldcastle: Gallery, 2000
 Love in the Wars. Oldcastle: Gallery, 2005 (adaptation of Heinrich von Kleist's Penthesilea)
 Todtnauberg. Radio play aired by the BBC in January 2006; later reissued as Conversation in the Mountains in 2008. about the conversations between Paul Celan and Martin Heidegger (and his relationship with Hannah Arendt) at Todtnauberg in the Black Forest in Germany.

Screenwriting
1983 or 1984?: Reflections (adaptation of The Newton Letter for Court House Films/Channel Four 1983. 90 mins)
1994: Seascape (TV film)
1999: The Last September (adaptation of the Elizabeth Bowen novel for Trimark Pictures)
2011: Albert Nobbs
2013: The Sea

Introductions

Other

Notes

References

External links
 John Banville's BBC radio plays

Bibliographies by writer
Bibliographies of Irish writers
John Banville